Vriesea monstrum is a plant species in the genus Vriesea. This species is native to Costa Rica, Nicaragua, Panama, Colombia, and Ecuador.

References

monstrum
Flora of Central America
Flora of Ecuador
Flora of Colombia
Plants described in 1919